Cornish College is an independent coeducational school in Melbourne, Australia. Located in Bangholme, the school caters for students in all year levels from three-year-olds, in the Early Learning Centre, to Year 12.

Location
Cornish College is located on the cusp of the Mornington Peninsula in Bangholme, Melbourne, Australia. The school is in close proximity to Port Phillip Bay and an hour’s drive south east of Melbourne’s CBD.

Curriculum
Cornish College offers a concept-based curriculum to ensure students gain rich understandings, a love of learning and vital enterprise skills such as creative thinking, collaboration and communication.

The Early Learning Centre is internationally recognised as a centre of excellence for children from 3 to 5 years of age and the curriculum centres on the Reggio Emilia approach to early learning, a benchmark for excellence in teaching young children.
Cornish College has been an authorised International Baccalaureate Primary Years Programme (PYP) school since its inception in 2012 and offers the PYP to 3 year olds through to Year 6.
 
This approach to teaching and learning is embraced in a multidisciplinary, concept-driven and inquiry-based program in the secondary years. Senior secondary students can select a number of pathways to attain Year 12 graduation, including Design Futures, Vocational Education and Training, Structured Workplace Learning, School-based Apprenticeship and the Victorian Certificate of Education.
 
Science, technology, engineering and mathematics (STEM) are key elements throughout the curriculum. Primary students explore STEM]] through a range of activities such as creating electronic storybooks, claymation projects, music and movie making, webpage design and robotics. 
Secondary students expand their STEM knowledge through Super Studies electives and VCE classes that offer diverse learning experiences spanning music technology, media design, photography, website design, designing solar-powered boats, videogame design, building a bluetooth-powered amplifier, investigating DNA data encryption and 3D printing.
 
Students can also participate in Real Time Learning programs and the NCSS GROK competition.

Rings of Sustainability
The Cornish College Rings of Sustainability provide a lens through which every aspect of the college is viewed – operations, curriculum design and engagement in critical thinking. The Rings represent four dimensions of sustainability that are interdependent:
The personal focuses on the individual, skills for living and wellbeing
Socio-cultural examines beliefs, customs and practices
Urban/technological takes an economic perspective
The natural considers issues from an environmental perspective, including how we, as local and global citizens, manage our ecological footprint, value and protect biodiversity and work to understand how we are connected with the Earth

Social responsibility
Cornish College is a supportive and cohesive community that values and prioritises the wellbeing of each person, with a strong and welcoming relationship with all those integral to our development – parents, alumni and friends and a strong sense of social justice.
 
Education is about teaching students to think for themselves and to become problem-identifiers as well as problem-solvers. Cornish students understand that they all have a responsibility to make a difference today for a sustainable, thriving future. They are encouraged to be active global leaders who consider how their decisions impact the world, confident in making a difference in their school and within the local community as well as globally.

Facilities
Cornish is a  classroom set in natural parkland – the environment is key to the vision of educating for a sustainable future – experiences with the natural environment help students understand and respect the interdependence between people, plants, animals and the land.
 
There are a myriad of outdoor activities that occur each day including climbing trees, building cubbies and forts, playing sport including golf on our unique golf links, exploring the island in the middle of our lake, following the Indigenous plant trail, exploring the grounds through the weekly Dhumba-dha biik program, identifying ecosystems and habitats, tending vegetable gardens, award-winning EcoCentre and caring for the animals on our farm.

Talent development
Differentiated programs provide support and challenges for students with a wide variety of abilities and interests within the classroom. In addition to the opportunities outlined below, students undertake enrichment and extension within their classrooms with their class teachers and additional teachers who support students.
Australian Mathematics Competition, Australasian Problem Solving Mathematical Olympiads, GATEWAYS, Science Talent Search, Big Science Competition, Aurecon Bridge Building Competition, Debating and Public Speaking, Victorian Curriculum and Assessment Authority Plain English Speaking Award, Da Vinci Decathlon, Tournament of Minds, Australian Geography Competition, National History Challenge, John Button School Prize, Parliament of Victoria – The Deakin Oration, United Nations Model Student and Conference, Australian Stock Exchange Sharemarket Game, Melbourne University’s Kwong Lee Dow Young Scholars Program, Girl Power in STEMM program and Monash University’s Year 8 ChallENGe Program.

Performing arts
Cornish College offers an extensive Performing Arts program with a range of performance opportunities. The program develops theoretical and practical performance skills across music, drama, dance and visual arts through individual and group classes, choirs, ensembles, band and instrumental programs and cocurricular tuition. Skills developed in these areas are showcased in a variety of performance opportunities within the college community, including productions, concerts, festivals, exhibitions and House competitions.

Southern Independent Schools
Cornish College is part of the Southern Independent Schools network of fifteen schools offering regular interschool sporting and cultural competitions throughout the school year.
 
Sports include athletics, cross country, swimming, baseball, basketball, cricket, football, handball, lawn bowls netball, soccer, softball, table tennis, tennis, touch rugby and volleyball.
 
Cultural events include chess, debating, drama/TheatreSports, Teen Chef, Book in a Day and Public Speaking Championships.

Sport
Sport takes many forms at Cornish College to best serve students’ needs and developmental progression. Both internal and external sporting competitions are offered with a focus on ‘sport for all’, so that every student has the opportunity to participate in activities that best fit their skills and confidence.
Healthy and inclusive competition is provided within the House structure with students able to participate in one of the three major sporting competitions – swimming, cross country and athletics – and through specific, individual competitions.
All students in Years 3 – 6 compete in our major House carnivals – swimming, athletics and cross country. In Years 5 and 6, Cornish students participate in the Coeducational Independent Primary Schools Sports Association competition, competing in a range of team sports against other coeducational independent primary schools.
From Years 7 – 12 students participate in the Southern Independent Schools sporting competition in many different sports.

Awards
The college, as well as individual staff members, has won a variety of awards including:
2011​ NEiTA Inspirational Teaching Award – Kirsty Liljegren, Director of the Early Learning Centre
John Laing Principal’s Award – Kerry Bolger, Principal
2012 Australia Day Hero Awards through Backpack Bed for Homeless – School of the Year Winner
2017​ Environment Education Victoria Awards – Excellence Award Nicola Forrest, Deputy Principal Australia Day Hero Awards through Backpack Bed for Homeless – School of the Year Winner
2018 Greater Dandenong Sustainability Awards – Community Category
Victorian Schools Garden Awards – State Award, for Prep to Year 12 schools
Victorian Schools Garden Awards – Regional Award, Most Engaging Student Garden for Learning
2020 ResourceSmart Schools Awards – Finalists, Embedding Sustainability ELC-Year 6 – ​​Curriculum Leadership School of the Year (Primary) and Embedding Sustainability – ​​Curriculum Leadership School of the Year (Secondary)
NEiTA Innovation in Online Teaching Award – Annemarie Denton (Integrated ​​​Curriculum Coordinator, Years 8 & 9)
Australia Day Hero Awards through Backpack Bed for Homeless – Educational Institution of the Year Winner
2021 Reconciliation Victoria and the Victorian Local Governance Association – Finalist in HART Awards

History
Cornish College officially opened in 2012, although it already had a rich history stemming from its roots as St Leonard’s, Patterson River campus, which had commenced in 1987.
Genesis.
In 1980, Richard Cornish, former Principal of St Leonard’s College, purchased 114 acres near the Patterson River for a new campus. The land was intended to be used for environmental, horticultural and agricultural studies; for sporting facilities; and as a feeder school for Prep – Year 8 students who would progress to St Leonard’s, Brighton for Years 9 – 12. St Leonard’s, Patterson River officially opened in February 1987.

Early years
When it opened, the school consisted of 67 students, five teachers, and eight classrooms. Key staff included the Head of Campus, Rev John Donnelly; Educational Director, Graeme Morgan; and Michael Davis, who later became the only staff member to have been part of the whole journey from St Leonard’s to the current day.

The early years saw important changes at the school. When Donnelly took long service leave, Wendy Adams became the Head of Campus and was key in developing and implementing innovative thematic courses of study. The campus was renamed the Richard Cornish campus – Cornish for short – creating a sense of tradition and community bolstered by enthusiastic staff, students and parents from Brighton, who assisted with planting thousands of trees around the campus.

In 1990, Kerry Bolger became the new Head of Campus. He further shaped the educational approach by re-emphasising environmental education and the farm ecosystem, adding a garden of indigenous plants and broadening subject choices for students. He also sought to establish the campus as its own, fostering connections between Cornish and the wider community.

Challenges
The college opened a new Early Learning Centre in 1995 in order to attract more families, with a music, drama and arts department, a multi-purpose centre (gymnasium, assembly hall, indoor sports centre) and new classrooms following suit. The Big Experience – now the Make A Difference Experience – became a curriculum highlight, focusing on social justice and personal development through service in disadvantaged communities.

Despite suburban development prompting an extension to Year 10 by 2000, financial pressures grew and in 2011, the College Council announced that the campus would close at the end of the year. A group of parents formed the Our New College Association to persuade the College Council to reverse its decision or, if not, to purchase the land and create a new school in its place. Following discussions, the Uniting Church in Australia provided funding for the purchase of the land and assets from St Leonard’s College, with an agreement reached on 30 June 2011, with a new school to open in 2012.

The birth of Cornish College
Kerry Bolger was appointed the first Principal of Cornish College, which officially opened on 2 February 2012. The college emphasised education of a different kind, combining inquiry-based learning and concept-based curriculum underpinned by the Rings of Sustainability –  four lenses through which students examined key ideas. Social justice was also important, evident in the college’s motto, Make A Difference.

By 2014, the college had expanded to Year 11, with its first cohort of Victorian Certificate of Education students.

Growth and consolidation
Vicki Steer became Cornish’s second Principal in January 2016 after Kerry Bolger retired in 2015. Steer was instrumental in continuing to grow firm foundations by developing strong, clear policies; revising the Constitution; incorporating the college as a separate legal entity; updating the five-year Strategic Plan; and developing a far-sighted master plan which included a new Senior Studies Centre that set the benchmark for future building projects.
2017 marked five years of Cornish College and enrolments reached 701. Steer continued the college’s commitment to sustainability, oversaw the growth of an emphasis on outdoor learning and was key in driving the college’s educational philosophy forward.

Today
Vicki Steer retired in July 2019, with Deputy Principal Nicola Forrest succeeding her as the third Principal of Cornish College. Forrest continues to emphasise Cornish’s roots in educating for a sustainable future. This vision involves challenging traditional educational norms by focusing on concepts rather than individual subjects, ensuring students develop critical and creative thinking skills to identify and solve problems and adapt to changing circumstances.

2022 marks 10 years of Cornish College – an exciting milestone for a school built on the tireless efforts of many passionate volunteers and members of the community. Cornish College’s growth and direction over the coming years will undoubtedly inspire students, staff and families within and beyond the college community.

Alumni
Whilst still a young school, connections with alumni are very important for Cornish College. Since its establishment in 2018, their alumni organisation Cornish Collegians is going from strength-to-strength with a regular reunions program, and building and maintaining strong connections with the college. Cornish alumni are already making a difference all around the world.

References

https://www.stleonards.vic.edu.au/brighton-private-school/school-history/
https://www.edarabia.com/la/
https://www.cornishcollege.vic.edu.au/about/history/
https://www.heraldsun.com.au/leader/south-east/bangholmes-cornish-college-now-thriving-after-being-dumped-by-st-leonard-five-years-ago/news-story/0255fbdfd9790cff1285ebfc708c1d73
https://ibaustralasia.org/schools/cornish-college
https://privateschoolsguide.com/cornish-college-bangholme-vic
https://www.ibo.org/en/school/002658
http://peninsulakids.com.au/advertiser/cornish-college/
https://bettereducation.com.au/CompareSchools/year_12/vic/compare_vce_school_ranking.aspx?enc=A7DDyBJGDAUxMYCyQEwjx3kggzVknEO+RVxj7UZ1VJ0mfOXkhcaIgdX3+ykc/UCj4d4iHuLQrVBsBhTLkUh6oQ
https://www.acnc.gov.au/charity/0c99fbfd1b6cb16088c65b20535ce4f8

Private schools in Melbourne